Lloyd Williams may refer to:

Lloyd Williams (businessman) (born 1940), Australian businessman and thoroughbred racehorse owner
Lloyd Williams (footballer) (born 1934), Australian footballer for Collingwood
Lloyd Williams (Welsh cricketer) (1925–2007), Welsh cricketer
Lloyd Williams (Jamaican cricketer) (born 1939), Jamaican cricketer
Lloyd Williams (filmmaker) (born 1940), American filmmaker
Lloyd Williams (rugby union, born 1933) (1933–2017), Welsh international rugby union player
Lloyd Williams (rugby union, born 1989) (1989–), Welsh international rugby union scrum-half
Lloyd W. Williams (1887–1918), American World War I Marine officer
J. Lloyd Williams (1854–1945), Welsh botanist, author, and musician
Lloyd Williams (singer), Jamaican reggae singer of the 1960s	
William Lloyd Garrison Williams (1888-1976), Canadian-American Quaker mathematician